Polwarth is a village and parish in the Scottish Borders area of Scotland.

Other places nearby include the Blackadder Water, Fogo, Langston, Longformacus, Marchmont House and Marchmont Estate, all in the Scottish Borders Council Area.

Polwarth Parish Church was built in 1703, replacing a 13th-century building.
Polwarth Castle was situated halfway between Polwarth village and Polwarth Parish Church.

The Polwarth Thorn was a thorn tree which was used in village festivities. Several verses and melodies have arisen, e.g.:
At Polwarth on the green / Our forebears oft are seen / To dance about the thorn / When they got in their corn. -  Also: At Polwarth on the Green / If you'll meet me in the morn / Where lads and lasses do convene  /  To dance around the thorn.

See also
Merse (Scotland)
List of places in the Scottish Borders

References

 McKinnon, E E (1969) 'Polwarth Mill, Nr Duns, hammer stone'
 John Mackay Wilson, 'Polwarth on the Green', in 'Tales of the Borders' (1835)

External links

RCAHMS record of Polwarth Castle
RCAHMS record of Polwarth Mill
British Listed Buildings: Packman's Brae, Polwarth Crofts
Gavinton Fogo & Polwarth Community Council
Polwarth Parish Church
Vision of Britain: Polwarth, Berwickshire

Villages in the Scottish Borders
Civil parishes of Scotland
Parishes in Berwickshire